Soichiro Tateoka (立岡 宗一郎, born May 18, 1990 in Kumamoto Prefecture) is a Japanese professional baseball outfielder for the Yomiuri Giants in Nippon Professional Baseball (NPB). He played with the Fukuoka SoftBank Hawks in 2010 and has played with the Giants since 2013.

On November 16, 2018, he was selected Yomiuri Giants roster at the 2018 MLB Japan All-Star Series exhibition game against Major League Baseball all-stars.

References

External links

NPB stats

1990 births
Living people
Japanese baseball players
Fukuoka SoftBank Hawks players
Nippon Professional Baseball outfielders
Baseball people from Kumamoto Prefecture
Yomiuri Giants players